Pitas may refer to:

 Pita, a round pocket bread
 Pitas, Malaysia, a town and district in Malaysia
 Pitas (state constituency), Malaysia